Tong Linge (29 October 1892–28 July 1937) or Tung Ling-ko of Manchu ethnicity was the Deputy Commander of the Chinese 29th Army in 1937 during the Marco Polo Bridge Incident and Battle of Beiping-Tianjin.

Formerly a soldier of the Northwestern, or Guominjun, Army he was recruited by Ji Hongchang to command the 1st Corps of the Chahar People's Anti-Japanese Army. He was tempted away from the Anti-Japanese Army to join Song Zheyuan's 29th Army later in 1933. Eventually he became Deputy Commander of 29th Army. He was killed along with Zhao Dengyu in the fighting around Nanyuan during the Battle of Beiping-Tianjin.

References

National Revolutionary Army generals from Hebei
1937 deaths
Manchu people
1892 births
People from Baoding